The arrondissement of Draguignan is an arrondissement of France in the Var department, Provence-Alpes-Côte d'Azur region. It has 54 communes.

Composition
The communes of the arrondissement of Draguignan, and their INSEE codes, are:

 Les Adrets-de-l'Estérel (83001)
 Ampus (83003)
 Les Arcs (83004)
 Bagnols-en-Forêt (83008)
 Bargème (83010)
 Bargemon (83011)
 La Bastide (83013)
 Le Bourguet (83020)
 Brenon (83022)
 Callas (83028)
 Callian (83029)
 Cavalaire-sur-Mer (83036)
 Châteaudouble (83038)
 Châteauvieux (83040)
 Claviers (83041)
 Cogolin (83042)
 Comps-sur-Artuby (83044)
 La Croix-Valmer (83048)
 Draguignan (83050)
 Fayence (83055)
 Figanières (83056)
 Flayosc (83058)
 Fréjus (83061)
 La Garde-Freinet (83063)
 Gassin (83065)
 Grimaud (83068)
 Lorgues (83072)
 La Martre (83074)
 La Môle (83079)
 Mons (83080)
 Montauroux (83081)
 Montferrat (83082)
 La Motte (83085)
 Le Muy (83086)
 Le Plan-de-la-Tour (83094)
 Puget-sur-Argens (83099)
 Ramatuelle (83101)
 Rayol-Canadel-sur-Mer (83152)
 Roquebrune-sur-Argens (83107)
 La Roque-Esclapon (83109)
 Saint-Antonin-du-Var (83154)
 Sainte-Maxime (83115)
 Saint-Paul-en-Forêt (83117)
 Saint-Raphaël (83118)
 Saint-Tropez (83119)
 Salernes (83121)
 Seillans (83124)
 Sillans-la-Cascade (83128)
 Tanneron (83133)
 Taradeau (83134)
 Tourrettes (83138)
 Trans-en-Provence (83141)
 Trigance (83142)
 Vidauban (83148)

History
The arrondissement of Draguignan was created in 1800. At the January 2017 reorganisation of the arrondissements of Var, it received two communes from the arrondissement of Brignoles, and it lost six communes to the arrondissement of Brignoles.

As a result of the reorganisation of the cantons of France which came into effect in 2015, the borders of the cantons are no longer related to the borders of the arrondissements. The cantons of the arrondissement of Draguignan were, as of January 2015:

 Callas
 Comps-sur-Artuby
 Draguignan
 Fayence
 Fréjus
 Grimaud
 Lorgues
 Le Luc
 Le Muy
 Saint-Raphaël
 Saint-Tropez
 Salernes

References

Draguignan